Kaspi is a district of Georgia, in the region of  Shida Kartli.  Given a District status within Transcaucasian SFSR in 1930.  District center is Kaspi.

Geography
The district occupies Shida Kartli plain, stretching on the both sides of Kura River - bordering southern parts of Greater Caucasus to the North and Trialeti Range to the South.  Bigger rivers crossing the District are Kura and Ksani.

District population is 43,771, population density is 55 per km² (2014).  There are 71 villages and 1 town in the District.

District economy is focused on agriculture, there are a few manufactures producing building materials and wine/spirits.

There are a number of historical and architectural sites in the District, including Rkoni Monastery, Samtavisi and Kvatakhevi churches.

Kavtiskhevi kurgans
Near the village of Kavtiskhevi in Kaspi Municipality some very ancient kurgans have been found. They were excavated by Makharadze in 2007.

Materials recovered from these excavations can be related to remains from the metal-working Late Chalcolithic site  of Leilatepe on the Karabakh steppe. Also, at Soyuqbulaq, Agstafa, there are similar kurgans.

Also, the earliest level at the multi-period site of Berikldeebi in Kvemo Kartli is relevant. These discoveries reveal the presence of early 4th millennium kurgans in the southern Caucasus.

See also 
 List of municipalities in Georgia (country)

Notes

External links 
 Districts of Georgia, Statoids.com

Municipalities of Shida Kartli
Archaeology of the Caucasus